Tetrameristaceae is a family of flowering plants. The family consists of five species, of trees or shrubs, in three genera:

 Pelliciera in Central and South America
 Pentamerista in the Guyanas
 Tetramerista in Southeast Asia

The APG II system places this family in the order Ericales, of the asterids.

In the APG III system, the genus Pelliciera, previously treated as its own family, Pellicieraceae, is included in Tetrameristaceae.

References

Ericales families
Ericales